The 2023 World Athletics Cross Country Championships took place on 18 February 2023 in Bathurst, Australia. It was the event's 44th edition and the second time after Auckland in 1988 that the championships were held in Oceania.

In March 2020 the course was revealed, to be held in the infield of the Mount Panorama Circuit.

In December 2020, the event was postponed from 2021 to 2022 due to the COVID-19 pandemic and Australian travel restrictions. The championships were once again delayed to 2023 in September 2021, due to Australian travel restrictions.

Schedule
The junior races preceded the senior races, and the senior men's event concluded the program.

Medalists

Medal table

Note: Totals include both individual and team medals, with medals in the team competition counting as one medal.

Participation
453 athletes from 48 countries were scheduled to participate.

References

External links
Official website

2023
World Cross Country Championships
International athletics competitions hosted by Australia
Cross country running in Australia
Athletics World Cross Country Championships
World Athletics Cross Country Championships, 2022
World Athletics Cross Country